Pasiphila debiliata, the bilberry pug, is a moth of the family Geometridae. It is found from Europe, east to southern Siberia, the Amur region and Japan.

The ground colour is a very delicate, evanescent pale green, the crosslines are much weak, strongest on the veins. — ab. nigropunctata Chant, has only the principal lines, these being marked as strong vein-dots. — grisescens Dietze is silvery grey without a tinge of green. Discal spot present.
 The larva is light green with scattered, fine, pale bristles.

Adults are on wing from June to July.

The larvae feed on Vaccinium myrtillus.

References

External links

Fauna Europaea
Lepiforum e.V.
UKMoths

Moths described in 1817
debiliata
Moths of Japan
Moths of Europe
Taxa named by Jacob Hübner